The Social Security Advisory Board (SSAB) is an independent, bipartisan board of the United States federal government. It was created by Congress and is appointed by the President and the Congress to advise the President, the Congress, and the Commissioner of Social Security on matters related to the Social Security and Supplemental Security Income programs.

History
In the United States in 1994, when Congress passed legislation establishing SSA as an independent agency, it also created a seven-member bipartisan Board to advise the President, the Congress, and the Commissioner of Social Security on policies related to Social Security’s old-age, survivors, and disability insurance (OASDI) and Supplemental Security Income (SSI) programs.  The legislation passed both Houses of Congress without opposition and President Clinton signed the Social Security Independence and Program Improvements Act of 1994 into law (P.L. 103-296) on August 15, 1994.  The law took effect on March 31, 1995.

References

External links
Social Security Online, the official website of the Social Security Administration
Official website of the Social Security Advisory Board

Independent agencies of the United States government